Mapogoro is an administrative ward in the Mbarali district of the Mbeya Region of Tanzania. In 2016 the Tanzania National Bureau of Statistics report there were 27,282 people in the ward, from 24,754 in 2012.

Villages and hamlets 
The ward has 9 villages, and 49 hamlets.

Itamba
 Mahango
 Mapangala
 Mapogoro
 Mbungu
 Mlangali
 Mtakuja
 Mabadaga
 Manyoro 'A'
 Manyoro 'B'
 Mnyurunyuru 'B'
 Munyurunyuru 'A'
 Mwanjelwa
 Utage
 Nyangulu
 Bogoro
 Nyangulu 'A'
 Nyangulu 'B'
 Tambukaleli
 Mbuyuni
 Kinawaga
 Maduli
 Magomeni
 Makondo
 Mkola
 Mlimani
 Muungano
 Uvanga
 Msesule
 Matenkini
 Mtambani
 Njola
 Mtamba
 Kilambo
 Mlangali 'A'
 Mlangali 'B'
 Mtamba 'A'
 Mtamba 'B'
 Ukwama
 Idege
 Lambitali
 Mbuyuni
 Ukwama 'A'
 Ukwama 'B'
 Ukwavila
 Chang'ombe
 Ibohora
 Ifushilo
 Ivaji
 Msumbiji
 Tambalagosi
 Uturo
 Kilambo 'A'
 Mabambila "B'
 Mabambila 'A'
 Mahango
 Uturo 'A'
 Uturo 'B'

References 

Wards of Mbeya Region